Hinduism is the largest religion of Assam, practiced by around 61% of the state population as per the 2011 Census. Hindus form a majority in 17 out of the 29 districts of Assam. By region, there is a significant diversity among the ethnic groups that profess the Hindu faith, traditions and customs. As per as 2011 Census, In Brahmaputra valley of Assam, Hindus constitute 62% of the population, most being ethnic Assamese. In the autonomous Bodoland region of Assam, Hindus constitute 71.3% of the region's population, most being of the Bodo tribe. In the Barak valley region of southern Assam, Hindus constitute 50% of the region's population, most being ethnic Sylhetis, a subgroup of Bengalis. The Hill Tribes of Assam, particularly the Karbi people of Karbi Anglong and Dimasa people of Dima Hasao are mainly Hindus.

History
Most of the Hindus in Assam belongs to the Ekasarna sect of Vaishnavism which is the dominant faith of the region since its formation from 15th–16th century in Brahmaputra valley, Assam. The Ahom kings during their 600 yrs rule in Assam, have increasingly patronizing Hinduism alongside the proselytizing activities of Ekasarana Dharma since the 16th-century—a large section of the Bodo-Kachari peoples converted to different forms of Hinduism in the 17th–18th century and a composite Assamese consisting of caste-Hindus, tribals began to form. Suhungmung, was the first Ahom king who have converted into Hinduism and adopt a Hindu title, Swarganarayana during that medieval period of ahom rule. But some sources also argue that Jayadhwaj Singha was the first Ahom king who have formally accepted Hinduism. Rudra Singha was the first who announced publicly of his inclination towards Hinduism and consequently later on he became a disciple of a Hindu Brahman priest. The historical roots of the Hindu religion in Assam dates back to at least 4th–7th centuries when  Varman dynasty were ruling in the region. Vedic sacrifices such as the Ashvamedha and other Brahmanical rites and rituals were prevalent in this region during that period. However, the Varman kings of Assam came mostly from non-Hindu tribal backgrounds, and the form of Hinduism that developed in the Assam region has long been a complex negotiation link between Sanskritic traditions with indigenous tribal practices and beliefs. Before the arrival of Hindu religion in the fertile valley of Brahmaputra, Majority of ethnic Assamese people practiced an indigenous religion known as Ahom religion, followed by Bodo people who professed Bathouism & various ethnic tribals like : Karbi, Dimasa, Mising & Rabha were practitioners of Animism prior to the coming of Hinduism in the valley.

The Vaishnavism which is a prominent sect of Hinduism in Assam don't believe in idol worship and perform "Naamkirtan", where the glory of formless Lord Vishnu is recited and chanted. There are two important cultural and religious institutions that influence the religious fabric of Assam: the "Satras", is a site of religious and cultural practice and the "Namghar", the house of prayers where religious people meet and pray together as a community.

Festivals

Bohag bihu 

The first day of Bohag bihu is called "Goru Bihu". Goru means cow. The first day is the bihu of cows and buffaloes. Goru bihu is related to the agricultural roots of Assam in rural areas. The day is dedicated to caring and upkeep of cattle (the wealth generator of farmers). Cows (sacred animal in hinduism) are bathed and smeared with turmeric and pulses near pond, and are worshiped as part of the festivities by Assamese hindu agriculturalists throughout Assam.

Ambubachi Mela 

During Ambubachi Mela, hindu sages from all over India came to the temple for doing certain black magic which is know by the local name of "Tantra Mantra". Kamakhya is centre of Tantric worship.

Bathou puja (worship) 

Bathow Puja is an important religious festival of the Bodo-Kacharies of Assam, India. In this festival, indigenous bodo people worship a god known by different names like Gila Damra, Khuria Bwrai, Sri Brai (Shib bwrai), Bathow Bwrai etc. Among these festivals, Kherai is the most significant and important.

Temples

Hajo 

Hajo is  a historic town set in the hills northwest of Guwahati, Assam, India. It is a sacred place for Hindus as an pilgrimage site. To the Hindus of Assam and world over, the Manikut Parbat of Hajo is the site of the 10th-century temple ruins and the 11th- to 16th-century temples complex for Vaishnavism as well as shrines of Shaivism and Shaktism.

Navagraha Temple 

Navagraha temple are an important pilgremages sites devoted to Navagraha—the nine (nava) major celestial bodies (Grahas) meaning planets of Hindu astronomy. The temple is made up of stones. These celestial bodies are named Surya means (Sun), Chandra means (Moon), Mangala means (Mars), Budha means (Mercury), Brihaspati means (Jupiter), Shukra means (Venus), Shani means (Saturn), Rahu means (North Lunar Node) and Ketu means (South Lunar Node). Many temples in Southern parts of India contain a shrine dedicated to the Navagrahas (nine planets). However, the term Navagraha temples refers to a cluster of nine separate temples, each an abode of one of the Navagrahas.

Basistha temple 

Basistha Temple is located in the south-east corner of Guwahati city, Assam and is a Shaiva mandir. The history of the Basistha Ashram where the temple is located dates back to the Vedic age. According to legend the ashram was founded by the great saint Basistha muni (Vasishtha). Temple in the ashram stands on the bank of the mountain streams originating from the hills of Meghalaya, which becomes the rivers Basistha and Bahini/Bharalu flowing throughout the city.

Umananda temple 

"Umananda" the smallest river island is located in the midst of river Brahmaputra flowing through the city of Guwahati in Assam. The British named the island Peacock Island for its structure. This temple is dedicated to Hindu deity Lord Shiva. According to Hindu mythology, Lord Shiva created the island for his wife Parvati's happiness and pleasure. Shiva is said to have resided here in the form of Bhayananda. According to a myth in Kalika Purana, Shiva burnt Kamadeva with his third eye on Umananda when he interrupted Shiva's deep meditation, hence the Island is also known as Bhasmachal. Maha Shivaratri is widely celebrated in Umananda. Monday is considered to be the holiest day in the temple and the new moon brings bliss to the hindu pilgrims.

Sukreshwar mandir 

The Sukreswar Temple is an important Shiva temple which was built in 1744 year by Ahom King Pramatta Singha. Leading down from the temple compound is a long flight of steps to the Brahmaputra river from where one can view the picturesque Umananda Island temple, the smallest river Island in the world. The temple is located on the Sukreswar or Itakhuli hill on the south bank of river Brahmaputra in the Panbazar locality of Guwahati city.

Dirgeshwari temple 

Dirgheswari Mandir is a temple situated in the northern banks of the river Brahmaputra river in Guwahati, Assam. Many ancient images depicting Hindu deities made on rocks existed along with the temple. Brick temple were made by Ahom king Swargadeo Siva Singha, Dirgheswari temple is considered as a Shakti Peetha for Shakti Worship. The main attraction of Dirgheswari temple is the annual Durga Puja celebrations, in which hindu devotees from far of places come to attend.

Demography

A part of Hinduism's percentage decline in Assam is due to lower fertility rates compared to the Muslim population and illegal immigration of Bangladeshis in Assam since from the late 1900s. Assam's total fertility rate is 1.9 according to NFHS-5. The rate is below the replacement rate of 2.1. In NFHS-3, which was conducted in 2005–06, Hindus in Assam had fertility rates of 1.95  respectively. By 2019–20, NFHS-5 showed Hindu fertility rate have fallen to 1.6.

Population by district (2011 year)

Below is a breakdown of the Hindu population by district in the Indian state of Assam according to the 2011 Census of India:
 Hindus are majority in eighteenth districts out of twenty-nine in Assam.

Trends 

The Hindu population in Assam have increased from 2.78 million in 1901 to 19.18 million in 2011 census (a growth of 16.4 million in 110 years). Hindus in Assam have a fertility rate of 1.6 in 2019–20. Between (2011–21) year for upcoming 2021 Census of India, it was predicted that Hindu growth rate have fallen below 10 percent leading to a population growth of only 20.16 million in 2021 from 19.18 million which was the previous census results of 2011.

Hindu percentage by decades in Assam

Assam's Hindu percentage has been steadily decreasing for over a century, though they experienced a slight rebound during the 1960s and 70s. The percentage of Hindus was 84.55% in 1901 and has declined to 61.47% in 2011 census, representing a decline of 23.08% in 110 years. The increase in the Hindu percentage during the period of (1961–1971) was mainly because of im-migration of East Pakistan's Hindu refugees into the state.

Hindu population by Ethnic Group

The Scheduled Tribes of Assam are mainly practitioners of Hindu faith. Of 38.84 lakh Scheduled Tribes counted in Assam in 2011, it was found that 33.50 lakh are Hindus; forming 86.24 percent of the ST population in the state. About 95% of the Ahom tribe, 90% of the Bodo tribe, 83% of the Karbi tribe, 99% of the Dimasa tribe, 94% of Rabha tribe, 97% of Mishing tribe are Hindu by faith.

See also 

 Demography of Assam
 Ahom religion
 Assamese people
 Bodo people
 Islam in Assam
 Christianity in Assam
 Bathouism
 Bengali Hindus in Assam
 Namghar
 Satra (Ekasarana Dharma)

References

External links